National Highways 183 (NH 183) is located in India. It connects Kollam High school Jn in Kerala with Dindigul in Tamil Nadu. Starting from Kollam it runs northwards to Chengannur and turns east at Kottayam and runs along the northern border of Periyar Wildlife Sanctuary before crossing the border into Tamil Nadu and end near Dindigul, where it joins NH 83(Coimbatore - Nagapattinam). This highway was previously known as NH 220.

Route

Kerala
Kollam H.S Jn. → Thevally → Thrikkadavoor → Anchalumoodu → Perinad → Kundara → Chittumala → East Kallada → Bharanikkavu → Chakkuvally → Sooranad North → Anayadi → Thamarakulam → Charummoodu → Chunakkara → Mankamkuzhy → Kochalummoodu → Kollakadavu → Kodukulanji → Anjilimoodu (Mulakkuzha) → Chengannur → Kallissery → Thiruvalla → Changanassery → Kottayam → Manarkadu → Pampady → Vazhoor → Ponkunnam → Kanjirapalli → Podimattom → Mundakayam → Peruvanthanam → Kuttikkanam → Azhutha → Peermade → Pambanar → Vandiperiyar → Kumily

Tamil Nadu
Kumily → Lower Camp → Gudalur → Cumbum → Uthamapalayam → Chinnamanur → Virapandi → Theni,

National Highway 183A
A new highway National Highway 183A (India) was declared in March 2014 which runs from Panmana Titanium Junction in (near Kollam) to Mundakkayam via Thevalakkara - Kovoor - Sasthamkotta - Bharanikavu - Kadampanad - Manakkala - Adoor - Anandapally – Thattayil – Kaipattoor – Omalloor – Pathanamthitta – Mylapra – Kumplampoika – Vadasserikara – Perunad – Lahai - Plappally - Kanamala - Mukkoottuthara - Erumeli - Mundakkayam. This highway is a shorter route to Vandiperiyar from Adoor via, Kaipattoor, Pathanamthitta rather than the long route from Kottayam.

References

 Ministry of Road Transport & Highways

183
183
National highways in India
Roads in Kollam district
Roads in Alappuzha district
Roads in Kottayam district
Roads in Idukki district